Carl Credner may refer to:

 Carl Friedrich Heinrich Credner (1809–1876), German geologist
 Carl Hermann Credner (1841–1913), his son, German earth scientist